Palmeria is a genus of flowering plant in the family Monimiaceae. Its range includes Sulawesi, New Guinea, the Bismarck Archipelago, and Australia (Queensland, New South Wales).<ref name = potw>"Palmeria F.Muell." Plants of the World Online. Accessed 22 August 2021. </ref>

It was defined by Ferdinand von Mueller in 1864 and named in honor of Sir James F. Palmer.Ferdinand von Mueller. Fragmenta Phytographiae Australiae. volume 4. page 151. 1864. 

Accepted species include:
 Palmeria angica Kaneh. & Hatus. New Guinea
 Palmeria arfakiana Becc. Sulawesi, New Guinea, Bismarck Archipelago
 Palmeria brassii Philipson New Guinea
 Palmeria clemensae Philipson New Guinea
 Palmeria coriacea C.T.White Queensland
 Palmeria foremanii Whiffin Queensland
 Palmeria gracilis Perkins New Guinea
 Palmeria hooglandii Philipson New Guinea
 Palmeria hypargyrea Perkins New Guinea
 Palmeria hypochrysea Perkins New Guinea
 Palmeria hypotephra (F.Muell.) Domin eastern Queensland
 Palmeria incana A.C.Sm. New Guinea
 Palmeria montana A.C.Sm. New Guinea
 Palmeria racemosa (Tul.) A.DC. Queensland, New South Wales
 Palmeria scandens F.Muell. New Guinea, Queensland, New South Wales
 Palmeria schoddei Philipson New Guinea
 Palmeria womersleyi'' Philipson New Guinea

References

Monimiaceae genera
Flora of Papuasia